Senator Motlow may refer to:

J. Reagor Motlow (1898–1978), Tennessee State Senate
Lem Motlow (1869–1947), Tennessee State Senate